Iru is a village in Jõelähtme Parish, Harju County, Estonia. It has a population of 331 (as of 1 January 2009).

First written records in the Danish Census Book mentioning Iru village date back to 1241.

See also
Pirita River
Iru hill fort
Iru Power Plant
Iru, Tallinn

References

External links 
 Iru village association

Villages in Harju County
Jõelähtme Parish